A Summer's Tale, Op. 29 is a tone poem for large orchestra by Josef Suk.

It is scored for a large orchestra of piccolo, 2 flutes, 2 oboes, 2 cors anglais, 2 clarinets, bass clarinet, 2 bassoons, contrabassoon, 6 horns, 3 trumpets, 3 trombones, tuba, timpani, cymbals, tam-tam, bass drum, piano, 2 harps, celesta, organ (ad lib) and strings.

The work was composed between 1907 and 1909 and was premiered in Prague on 26 January 1909, by the Czech Philharmonic conducted by the dedicatee Karel Kovařovic.   It was initially coolly received—–several critics charged it with being impressionistic.

Structure and character 

There are five movements:

Voices of Life and Consolation
Midday
Blind Musicians
In the Power of Phantoms
Night.

A performance typically takes one hour.

Rob Cowan has described the work as Scriabinesque and found in it a foreshadowing of Shostakovich's orchestration.

References 

Compositions by Josef Suk
1909 compositions
Symphonic poems